Order (stylised as ORDER) is an Australian professional esports organisation based in Melbourne. It currently has teams competing in Counter-Strike: Global Offensive, FIFA, League of Legends, Rainbow Six Siege, Street Fighter V, and Valorant. The organisation entered voluntary administration on 17 August 2022.

Order's League of Legends team won its first domestic title on 11 April 2022, after defeating The Chiefs in the LCO 2022 Split 1 finals.

League of Legends

History

Founding 
Order acquired the Oceanic Pro League (OPL) spot of Team Regicide on 14 December 2017. Its inaugural roster consisted of top laner James "Tally" Shute, jungler Samuel "Spookz" Broadley, mid laner Simon "Swiffer" Papamarkos, bot laner Ian "FBI" Victor Huang, and support Jake "Rogue" Sharwood.

2018 season 
Order placed third in the regular season of OPL 2018 Split 1, qualifying them for the second round of playoffs. Legacy Esports defeated Order after a close series and knocked them out of playoffs. In Split 2, Order once again placed third in the regular season and was once again knocked out of playoffs by Legacy Esports in the second round.

2019 season 
Finishing fifth in the OPL 2019 Split 1 regular season, Order entered playoffs with the lowest seed for playoffs and began in the first round against Mammoth. To the surprise of many analysts and fans, the Order went on a Cinderella run after defeating Mammoth, sweeping third-place Avant Gaming and second-place The Chiefs. However, Order's streak was ended by the Bombers in the finals, with the latter sweeping the former.

Order once again placed fifth in the regular season of Split 2 and, after defeating the Dire Wolves and the Bombers in the first and second rounds, respectively, they were eliminated from playoffs by a revamped Mammoth.

2020 season 
Order finished fourth in the OPL 2020 Split 1 regular season, qualifying for the lower bracket of playoffs (the playoffs format had been changed to a double elimination bracket prior to the start of the 2020 season). After eliminating Avant Gaming in the first round, Order was themselves eliminated by the Dire Wolves after a close series in the second round.

Improving from Split 1, Order finished second in Split 2 regular season, qualifying for the winners' bracket. After defeating Pentanet.GG in the first round, Order were knocked down to the lower bracket by Legacy Esports. Winning their subsequent match against The Chiefs in the third round, Order advanced to a rematch against Legacy Esports in the finals, which Order lost.

2021 season 
The League of Legends Circuit Oceania (LCO) replaced the OPL prior to the 2021 season, and Order was announced as one of its eight franchise teams.

Order placed fourth in the LCO 2021 Split 1 regular season and were promptly knocked out by The Chiefs in the first round of the lower bracket. Order fared better in Split 2, placing second in the regular season; however, they were knocked out of playoffs by Peace in the second round of the lower bracket after a close series.

2022 season 
For LCO 2022 Split 1, Order signed Brandon "BioPanther" Alexander, jungler Shane "Kevy" Allen, mid laner Ronald "Kisee" Vo, bot laner Nathan "Puma" Puma, and support Ian "Corporal" Pearse. Top laner Maximus "Maximize" Yaremenko moved to a substitute position.

Order placed fourth in the regular season and qualified for the first round of the lower bracket of playoffs. There, the team swept fifth-place Dire Wolves before sweeping second-place Peace in an upset result in the second round. Order defied the expectations of analysts and fans again by sweeping third-place Pentanet.GG in the third round and qualifying for the finals. After defeating The Chiefs in a close series, Order won its first domestic title and qualified for the 2022 Mid-Season Invitational. Order finished 7-8th in the event following a 0-8 record against Evil Geniuses and G2 Esports.

Current roster

References

External links 
 

2017 establishments in Australia
Esports teams established in 2017
Esports teams based in Australia
Counter-Strike teams
FIFA (video game series) teams
League of Legends Circuit Oceania teams
Tom Clancy's Rainbow Six Siege teams
Valorant teams
Fighting game player sponsors